In the 1932 Tour de France, for the third year, the race was run in the national team format, with five different teams. Belgium, Italy, Switzerland and France each sent a team with eight cyclists, while Germany and Austria sent a combined team, with seven German cyclists and one Austrian cyclist. In addition, 40 cyclists joined as touriste-routiers.

Charles Pélissier, who had won 13 stages in the 1930 and 1931 Tours, and Antonin Magne, the winner of 1931, were absent from the French team. Still, there were so many good French cyclists in that time that the French team was still considered superior.

The Italian team included three Giro d'Italia winners: the winner from the 1930 Giro d'Italia, Luigi Marchisio; the winner from the 1931 Giro d'Italia, Francesco Camusso and the winner from the 1932 Giro d'Italia, Antonio Pesenti.

The Belgium team had Jef Demuysere, who had fought for the victory in the previous Tour until the end and had become second, and two-time world champion Georges Ronsse.

By team

By rider

By nationality

References

1932 Tour de France
1932